Poruba is a village in central Slovakia.

History
In historical records the village was first mentioned in 1339.

Geography
The municipality lies at an altitude of 400 metres and covers an area of 15.145 km². It has a population of about 1,287 people. Poruba belongs to the Prievidza District of the Trenčín Region.

References

External links
 
 

Villages and municipalities in Prievidza District